Nobuteru (written: 伸晃, 信輝 or 亘輝) is a masculine Japanese given name. Notable people with the name include:

 (born 1957), Japanese politician
 (born 1965), Japanese singer-songwriter
Nobuteru Mori, Japanese businessman and politician
 (born 1971), Japanese racing driver
 (born 1962), Japanese manga artist, illustrator and animator

Japanese masculine given names